Pachyplastis is a monotypic moth genus of the family Erebidae. Its only species, Pachyplastis apicalis, is found in the Brazilian state of Amazonas. Both the genus and species were first described by Felder in 1874.

References

Calpinae
Monotypic moth genera